SM U-72 was one of 329 submarines serving in the Imperial German Navy in World War I. U-72 was engaged in the commerce war in First Battle of the Atlantic.

Design
German Type UE I submarines were preceded by the longer Type U 66 submarines. U-72 had a displacement of  when at the surface and  while submerged. The submarine was powered by two  engines for use while surfaced, and two  engines for use while submerged. She had two propeller shafts.

U-72 was fitted with two  torpedo tubes (one at the port bow and one starboard stern), four torpedoes, and one  deck gun. She had a complement of thirty-two (twenty-eight crew members and four officers).

Operations 
U-72 left the stocks at Hamburg (AG Vulcan) in March 1916, joined the Kiel School, and first entered North Sea on 11 April 1916. Attached 1st Half Flotilla, under the command of Kaptlt. Krafft.
15–21 April 1916. Cruise in North Sea. Returned with defects.
23–2 May 1916. ? Cruise in North Sea.
21 June to 4 July 1916. Northabout. Laid mines off Cape Wrath.
20 August - ? 15 September 1916. Northabout to Mediterranean. Laid mines off Lisbon, Oran and Cape Blanc. On arriving at Cattaro joined the Pola-Cattaro Flotilla.
Of U-72s operations in the Mediterranean, little is known after her arrival in September 1916.
On a cruise from the middle of February 1917 until 6 March 1917, she sank 4 steamers and stopped British hospital ship, Dunluce Castle. She damaged  and was later unsuccessfully attacked by armed trawlers.
U-72 was reported as not having cruised, with the above exception, after January 1917, and was regarded as a lame duck. Indeed of her class, U-71 to U-80 (all minelayers), U-80 was the only boat not continually in dockyard hands. At the end of October 1918, U-72 was blown up at evacuation of Cattaro.

Summary of raiding history

References

Notes

Citations

Bibliography

World War I submarines of Germany
1915 ships
U-boats commissioned in 1916
Ships built in Hamburg
U-boats scuttled in 1918
German Type UE I submarines
Maritime incidents in 1918